La Serneta (1837 in Jerez de la Frontera – 1910 in Utrera) was a famous Spanish flamenco singer (cantaora). She was seminal in soleares style. Her real name was Mercedes Fernández Vargas and she was a very popular celebrity in flamenco cafés.

References

1837 births
1910 deaths
People from Jerez de la Frontera
Singers from Andalusia
Flamenco singers
19th-century Spanish women singers